James D. Boys is a British academic and media consultant. He has written on aspects of American history and political life in the late twentieth century, including an examination of the foreign policy of the Clinton administration (1993–2001).

Career

 2002–2006: visiting lecturer, Birmingham University
 2004–2004: visiting lecturer, University of Gloucestershire
 2005–2005: visiting lecturer, Leicester University
 2006–2006: visiting lecturer, De Montfort University
 2006–2011: consulting professor, Syracuse University
 2006–2010: assistant professor of international political studies, Richmond, The American International University in London
 2010–2011: visiting fellow, University of North Dakota
 from 2010: associate professor of international political studies, Richmond, The American International University in London
 from 2010: director, international relations postgraduate degree program, Richmond, The American International University in London
 from 2011: senior research fellow at the Global Policy Institute in London

Publications

His publications include:
 James D. Boys, JFK: The Exceptional Ideal? in JFK: History, Memory, Legacy: An Interdisciplinary Inquiry, edited by John Williams, Robert G. Waite and Gregory Gordon, University of North Dakota Press, 2009
 , Michael Keating, The Policy Brief: Building Practical Skills in International Relations and Political Science, in Politics, edited by Alasdair Young, October 2009
 , Hind Zantout, E-Government: Big Brother of Athenian Democracy, in Proceedings of the IADIS International Conference e-society 2009: Volume II, edited by Piet Kommers and Pedro Isaías, Barcelona, Spain, 2009 pp 13–17. 
 , Clinton's Grand Strategy: US Foreign Policy in a Post-Cold War World, London: Bloomsbury, 2015.
  An examination of the Clinton Administration efforts to deal with Iran and Iraq.
   An examination of the Anglo-American relationship during the 1990s.
  An examination of the Somali deployment and its impact upon the second Bush Administration.

References

British historians
Living people
Alumni of the University of Northampton
Alumni of the University of Birmingham
Year of birth missing (living people)